Harvey station is on the Canadian National Railway mainline in Tête Jaune Cache, British Columbia.  The station is served by Via Rail's Jasper–Prince Rupert train as a flag stop.

References

External links 
Via Rail Station Description

Via Rail stations in British Columbia